CFAV may refer to:

 Canadian Forces Auxiliary Vessel, see Fleet of the Royal Canadian Navy
 CJLV, a French-language Canadian radio station located in Laval, Quebec, near Montreal, Canada; from 2004 to 2010 it was called CFAV.
 Cadet Force Adult Volunteers, see Army Cadet Force